Íris Grönfeldt (born 8 February 1963) is an Icelandic athlete. She competed in the women's javelin throw at the 1984 Summer Olympics and the 1988 Summer Olympics.

References

External links
 

1963 births
Living people
Athletes (track and field) at the 1984 Summer Olympics
Athletes (track and field) at the 1988 Summer Olympics
Íris Grönfeldt
Íris Grönfeldt
People from Borgarbyggð